Government Degree College, Dharmanagar, established in 1979, is a general degree college in Dharmanagar, Tripura, India. It offers undergraduate courses in arts, commerce and sciences. It is affiliated to Tripura University.

Departments

Science
Chemistry
Physics
Mathematics
Information technology
Botany
Zoology
Physiology

Arts
• Physical Education
Bengali
English
Sanskrit
History
Political science
Philosophy
Education
Economics

Commerce
Accountancy

Accreditation
The college is recognized by the University Grants Commission (UGC).

See also
Education in India
Education in Tripura
Tripura University
Literacy in India
List of institutions of higher education in Tripura

References

External links

Colleges affiliated to Tripura University
Educational institutions established in 1979
Universities and colleges in Tripura
1979 establishments in Tripura
Colleges in Tripura